Antonella Luigina Bizioli (born 29 March 1957 in Villa d'Ogna) is a former Italian long-distance runner who specialized in the marathon race.

She won two medals, with national team, at the World Marathon Cup.

Biography
She participated at one editions of the Summer Olympics (1988) and one of the IAAF World Championships in Athletics (1987).

Achievements

See also
 Italy at the 1988 Summer Olympics

References

External links
 

1957 births
Living people
Italian female marathon runners
Athletes (track and field) at the 1988 Summer Olympics
Olympic athletes of Italy
World Athletics Championships athletes for Italy
20th-century Italian women
21st-century Italian women